Emona (early ) or Aemona (short for ) was a Roman castrum, located in the area where the navigable Ljubljanica river came closest to Castle Hill, serving the trade between the city's settlers – colonists from the northern part of Roman Italy – and the rest of the empire. 
Emona was the region's easternmost city, although it was assumed formerly that it was part of the Pannonia or Illyricum, but archaeological findings from 2008 proved otherwise.
From the late 4th to the late 6th century, Emona was the seat of a bishopric that had intensive contacts with the ecclesiastical circle of Milan, reflected in the architecture of the early Christian complex along Erjavec Street in present-day Ljubljana.

The Visigoths camped by Emona in the winter of 408/9, the Huns attacked it during their campaign of 452, the Langobards passed through on their way to Italy in 568, and then came incursions by the Avars and Slavs. The ancient cemetery in Dravlje indicates that the original inhabitants and invaders were able to live peacefully side by side for several decades. After the first half of the 6th century, there was no life left in Emona. The 18th-century Ljubljana Renaissance elite shared the interest in Antiquity with the rest of Europe, attributing the founding of Ljubljana to the mythical Jason and the Argonauts. Other ancient Roman towns located in present-day Slovenia include Nauportus (now Vrhnika), Celeia (now Celje), Neviodunum (now the village of Drnovo) and Poetovio (now Ptuj).

History
 

During the 1st century BC a Roman military stronghold was built on the site of the present Ljubljana, below Castle hill. Construction of the Roman settlement of Emona, fortified with strong walls, followed in AD 14. It had a population of 5,000 to 6,000 people, mostly merchants and craftsmen, and was also an important Early Christian centre with its own goddess, Equrna. Emona’s administrative territory or ager stretched from Atrans (Trojane) along the Karawanks mountains towards the north, near Višnja Gora to the east, along the Kolpa River in the south, and bordered to the west with the territory of Aquileia at the village of Bevke.

According to Ammianus Marcellinus, one of the reasons for the war between the Licinius and the Constantine the Great was that the Licinius destroyed the busts and statues of Constantine at Emona.

After few months of occupation in 388, the citizens of Emona saluted Emperor Theodosius I entering the liberated city after the victorious Battle of the Save, where Theodosius I defeated the army of the Roman usurper Magnus Maximus.

In 452, Emona was virtually destroyed by the Huns, led by Attila. Its remaining inhabitants fled the city; some of them made it to the coast of Istria, where they founded a "second Emona", Aemonia, now the town of Novigrad (meaning "New City"), in Croatia.

Historical descriptions
According to Herodotus, Emona was founded by Jason, when he travelled through the country with the Argonauts, and named by him in honour of his Thessalian homeland.
Sozomen wrote that when the Argonauts left from the Aeetes, they returned from a different route, crossed the sea of Scythia, sailed through some of the rivers there, and when they were near the shores of Italy, they built a city in order to stay at the winter, which they called Emona. Zosimus wrote that after they left from the Aeetes, they arrived at the mouth of the Ister river which it discharges itself into the Black Sea and they went up that river against the stream, by the help of oars and convenient gales of wind. After they managed to do it, they built the city of Emona as a memorial of their arrival there.

According to the 18th-century historian Johann Gregor Thalnitscher, the original predecessor of Emona was founded c. 1222 BC. (The date, although based on legend and poetic speculation, actually fits in both with Herodotus' account and the date of the earliest archaeological remains found so far)

According to 1938 article by the historian Balduin Saria, Emona was founded in late AD 14 or early AD 15, on the site of the Legio XV Apollinaris, after it left for Carnuntum, by a decree of Emperor Augustus and completed by his successor, Emperor Tiberius. Later archaeological findings have not rejected nor clearly confirmed this hypothesis and it is currently most widely accepted.

Location and layout

The location of Emona overlaps with the southwest part of the old nucleus of the modern city of Ljubljana. In a rectangle with a central square or forum and a system of rectangular intersecting streets, Emona was laid out as a typical Roman town. According to Roman custom, there were cemeteries along the northern, western, and eastern thoroughfares into the city – from the directions of Celeia, Aquileia, and Neviodunum. The wider area surrounding the town saw the development of typical Roman countryside: villages, hamlets, estates, and brickworks.

Archaeological findings

Archaeological findings have been found in every construction project in the center of Ljubljana. Intensive archaeological research on Emona dates back 100 years, although it was the Roman town was portrayed from the 17th century onward. Numerous remains have been excavated there, such as parts of the Roman wall, residential houses, statues, tombstones, several mosaics, and parts of the early Christian baptistery, which can be still seen today.

Regarding its location within Roman Italy, in 2001 a boundary stone between Aquileia and Emona was discovered in the vicinity of Bevke in the bed of the Ljubljanica River. The stone is made of Aurisina limestone. Because similar stones were only used to demarcate two communities belonging to the same Roman province and because it is not disputed that Aquileia belonged to Roman Italy, this means that both towns belonged to Italy and that Emona was never part of Illyricum (or, later, of the province of Pannonia).

Archaeological parks and preserving of the heritage
The architect Jože Plečnik redesigned the remains of the Roman walls: he cut two new passages to create a link to Snežnik Street and Murnik Street, and behind the walls he arranged a park displaying architectural elements from Antiquity, with a stone monument collection in the Emona city gate. Above the passageway to Murnik Street he set up a pyramid, which he covered with turf. After the Second World War, attempts were made to embed references to Emona grid into modern Ljubljana, with the Roman forum becoming part of the Ferant Park apartment blocks and an echo of the rotunda located along Slovenia Street.

Bishopric
There was a Christian bishopric named Aemona, whose bishop Maximus participated in the Council of Aquileia, 381, which condemned Arianism. After the destruction of Aemona in the 7th century, the bishop's seat was transferred to Novigrad. In Latin the name Aemona continued to be used for the diocese. Originally a suffragan of the Patriarchate of Aquileia, in 1272 it was attached instead to the ecclesiastical province and patriarchate of Grado, a patriarchate that in 1451 passed to Venice. In 1828 Pope Leo XII abolished the see as a residential diocese with effect from the death of Bishop Teodoro Lauretano Balbi on 23 May 1831. Its territory then passed to the diocese of Trieste-Capodistria. The Second World War brought about a change of political borders and in 1977 what had been the territory of the diocese of Aemona or Cittanova became part of the Croatian diocese of Poreč and Pula.

No longer a residential bishopric, Aemona or Cittanova is today listed by the Catholic Church as a titular see.

Because of the connection of this Aemona with Istria, some have questioned whether the episcopal see is to be identified with the Emona or Aemona, whose site is now occupied by Ljubljana. It has even been argued that there were in fact three cities called by the same or similar names, the one that Pliny the Elder speaks of as a colonia in the province of Pannonia; another in the province of Noricum; and a third in Istria.

Emona in literary fiction
 Emona is the setting of a 1978 novel Tujec v Emoni (Stranger in Emona) by Mira Mihelič.
 Emona is mentioned in Elizabeth Kostova's debut novel The Historian.
 The four volumes of the 2014 series Rimljani na naših tleh (Romans on our soil) by Ivan Sivec describe Emona in various epochs.
 Several chapters of the novel series Romanike are set in Emona.

Gallery

References

Further reading
 Ljudmila Plesničar Gec. Urbanizem Emone / The Urbanism of Emona. City Museum of Ljubljana; The Research Institute of the Faculty of Arts and Humanities. Ljubljana, 1999.
 MS Kos. Emona was in Italy not Pannonia. 2003

External links

  Bernarda Županek: Emona: mesto v imperiju/Emona: A City of the Empire (Slovene, English)
 Interactive archaeological map of Emona on top of map of Ljubljana. Geopedia.si.
 Early Christian Centre of Emona. 3D images. Burger.si.
 Panoramic virtual tour of the ancient wall of Emona
 Culture.si articles about the city: Roman Emona, Emona, Legacy of a Roman City
 A day in Emona, short movie about life in Roman settlement

Roman towns and cities in Slovenia
Coloniae (Roman)
History of Ljubljana
Aemona
Ancient Greek geography
Argonautica
Roman fortifications in Slovenia